The 1990 NCAA Division I women's basketball tournament began on March 11 and ended on April 1. The tournament featured 48 teams. The Final Four consisted of Virginia, Stanford, Auburn, and Louisiana Tech, with Stanford defeating Auburn 76-60 to win its first NCAA title. Stanford's Jennifer Azzi was named the Most Outstanding Player of the tournament.

Notable events

Forty-eight teams started the tournament on the eleventh of March. Thirteen days later, there were four team left, Virginia, Auburn, Louisiana Tech and Stanford, headed to Knoxville, Tennessee for the Final Four.

Stanford, after playing in the initial 1982 tournament, did not qualify between 1983 and 1987, but had reached the Sweet Sixteen in 1988, and the Elite Eight in 1989. Virginia was competing in their seventh consecutive NCAA tournament, finishing as high as the Elite Eight in 1988. However, they had been knocked out of the tournament by Tennessee in each of the last three tournaments.

Auburn, coached by Joe Ciampi, had been to all but one of the NCAA tournaments, and reached the last two Final Fours, but finished in the Runner-up position in each year. Louisiana Tech had not just played in every NCAA tournament, but had reached at least the Elite Eight every year, and had two national championships.

For the fourth consecutive year, Virginia faced Tennessee in the tournament. The previous three match ups were all won by Tennessee, including an 80–37 win in the 1989 tournament. This time, led by Dawn Staley who would win the MVP for her performance in the East Regional, the Cavaliers took the Volunteers to overtime, and won 79–75. Virginia next faced Stanford, who had only lost one game all season, and reached the final four by beating Arkansas 114–87 in the West Regional. Stanford wouldn't lose this game, and prevailed over Virginia 75–66.

In the other semi-final game, Auburn faced Louisiana Tech. Auburn came into the tournament as the prior year's runner-up, but was a two seed in the bracket with Washington, the only team to beat Stanford during the regular season. Auburn won easily, beating the Huskies 76–50. The Tech team, only two years removed from their last national championship, were a 1 seed and beat Texas to advance to the Final Four. Auburn was too strong for the Lady Techsters, and advanced to the championship game with an 81–69 victory.

Over twenty thousand people bought tickets for the championship game in Knoxville, the largest crowd ever (at the time) to watch a women's basketball game. In 1985, Stanford head coach Tara VanDerveer had traveled to Knoxville to meet with the family of Jennifer Azzi, to try to persuade Azzi to come to Stanford. Despite finishing 9–19 the year before, VanDerveer talked about competing for a national championship, Azzi came to Stanford, and four years later, was twenty miles from her Oak Ridge hometown, playing for the national championship. Auburn, led by Caroline Jones, pulled out to a nine-point lead in the first half. Then Azzi, who had not been able to even take a shot in the first eleven minutes, took over. She brought the team to a tie at halftime, and helped lead a 9–2 run early in the second half to take over the game. Azzi would win the tournament award for the most outstanding player, and her teammate Katy Steding set three point shooting records to help Stanford win their first national championship 88–81, while Auburn would finish as runner-up for the third consecutive year.

Records

Katy Steding set the Final Four record for both three points field goal attempts (15) and three point field goals made (6), in the championship game against Auburn.

Stanford set the NCAA Women's Tournament record for assist in a single games, with 37 assists in their regional final game against Arkansas.

Qualifying teams – automatic
Forty-eight teams were selected to participate in the 1990 NCAA Tournament. Twenty-one conferences were eligible for an automatic bid to the 1990 NCAA tournament.

Qualifying teams – at-large
Twenty-seven additional teams were selected to complete the forty-eight invitations.

Bids by conference
Twenty-one conferences earned an automatic bid.  In eleven cases, the automatic bid was the only representative from the conference. Two conferences (North Star, Big West) sent two representatives as an at-large team. Twenty-four additional at-large teams were selected from ten of the conferences.

First and second rounds

In 1990, the field remained at 48 teams. The teams were seeded, and assigned to four geographic regions, with seeds 1-12 in each region. In Round 1, seeds 8 and 9 faced each other for the opportunity to face the 1 seed in the second round, seeds 7 and 10 played for the opportunity to face the 2 seed, seeds 5 and 12 played for the opportunity to face the 4 seed, and seeds 6 and 11 played for the opportunity to face the 3 seed. In the first two rounds, the higher seed was given the opportunity to host the first-round game. In most cases, the higher seed accepted the opportunity. The exception:

 Seventh seeded Penn State played tenth seeded Florida State at Florida State

The following table lists the region, host school, venue and the thirty-two first and second round locations:

Regionals and Final Four

The regionals, named for the general location, were held from March 22 to March 24 at these sites:

 East Regional  E.A. Diddle Arena, Bowling Green, Kentucky (Host: Western Kentucky University)
 Mideast Regional  Memorial Coliseum (Beard–Eaves–Memorial Coliseum), Auburn, Alabama (Host: Auburn University)
 Midwest Regional  Thomas Assembly Center, Ruston, Louisiana (Host: Louisiana Tech University)
 West Regional  Maples Pavilion, Stanford, California (Host: Stanford University)

Each regional winner advanced to the Final Four, held March 30 and April 1 in Knoxville, Tennessee at the Thompson-Boling Arena (Host: University of Tennessee)

Bids by state

The forty-eight teams came from thirty states.
California and Illinois had the most teams with four each.  Twenty states did not have any teams receiving bids.

Brackets
First- and second-round games played at higher seed except where noted.

East regional – Norfolk, VA

West regional – Stanford, CA

Mideast regional – Iowa City, IA

Midwest regional – Austin, Texas

Final Four – Knoxville, TN

Record by conference
Fifteen conferences had more than one bid, or at least one win in NCAA Tournament play:

Eight conferences went 0-1: Big Eight, Big Sky Conference, Colonial, Gateway, MAAC, MAC, Southern Conference, and WAC

All-Tournament team

 Jennifer Azzi, Stanford
 Katy Steding, Stanford
 Carolyn Jones, Auburn
 Chantel Tremitiere, Auburn
 Venus Lacy, Louisiana Tech

Game officials

 Patty Broderick  (semifinal)
 June Courteau (semifinal)
 Sue Kennedy (semifinal)
 Bob Trammel (semifinal)
 Sally Bell (final)
 Art Bomengen (final)

See also
 1990 NCAA Division I men's basketball tournament
1990 NCAA Division II women's basketball tournament
1990 NCAA Division III women's basketball tournament
1990 NAIA women's basketball tournament

References

Tournament
NCAA Division I women's basketball tournament
NCAA Division I women's basketball tournament
NCAA Division I women's basketball tournament
Basketball in Austin, Texas